Corylus americana, the American hazelnut or American hazel, is a species of deciduous shrub in the genus Corylus, native to the eastern and central United States and extreme southern parts of eastern and central Canada.

Description
It is a medium to large shrub, which under some conditions can take the like of a small tree. It is often multi-stemmed with long outward growing branches that form a dense spreading or spherical shape.

The male catkins develop in the fall and remain over the winter. Each male flower on a catkin has a pair of bracts and four stamens.

American hazelnut produces edible nuts that mature at a time between July and October. Each nut is enclosed in two leaf-like bracts with irregularly laciniate margins.

Ecology 
The nuts produced by American hazelnut are a mast of squirrels, deer, turkey, woodpeckers, pheasants and other animals. The male catkins are a food staple of ruffed grouse throughout the winter.

Uses 
The nuts are edible raw, although smaller than the more commonly cultivated filberts (Corylus maxima, Corylus colurna, Corylus avellana, and hybrids thereof).

Native Americans used Corylus americana for medicinal purposes.

Cultivation
Corylus americana is cultivated as an ornamental plant for native plant gardens, and in wildlife gardens to attract and keep fauna in an area. There are cultivated hybrids of Corylus americana with Corylus avellana which aim to combine the larger nuts of the latter with the former's resistance to a North American fungus Cryptosporella anomala.

It is a medium to fast-growing species, that suckers moderately, eventually producing a multi-stemmed, clump appearance.

It adapts well to a range of soil pH and types, but does best on well-drained loams. American hazelnut prefers full sun for best growth and development. Though it can grow and persist in partial shade, plant density and fruit production are greatly reduced.

References

External links

 Corylus americana Photos, drawings, description from Nature Manitoba.

americana
Edible nuts and seeds
Flora of Eastern Canada
Flora of the North-Central United States
Flora of the Northeastern United States
Flora of the Southeastern United States
Plants described in 1788
Plants used in traditional Native American medicine
Garden plants of North America